, provisionally known as 2003 EE16, is an Apollo near-Earth asteroid and potentially hazardous object. It was discovered on 8 March 2003 by LPL/Spacewatch II at an apparent magnitude of 20 using a  reflecting telescope. The asteroid was listed on Sentry Risk Table with a Torino Scale rating of 1 on 2 April 2003.

Description 

Many of the virtual impactors were located near the nominal orbital solution and the asteroid has a low inclination relative to Earth's orbit. Observation by the Very Large Telescope (VLT) 8 meter facilities on 22 May and 19 June 2003 when  was very dim with an apparent magnitude between 24–25 refined the orbit. It was removed from the Sentry Risk Table on 28 May 2003.

 has the smallest Earth Minimum orbit intersection distance (MOID) of any known potentially hazardous asteroid. Earth impactors  and 2014 AA had small Earth MOID values as they were on their impact approach when discovered.

Notes

References

External links 
 
 
 

177049
177049
177049
177049
20140701
20030308